In geometry, a golden spiral is a logarithmic spiral whose growth factor is , the golden ratio.

Approximations of the golden spiral 

There are several comparable spirals that approximate, but do not exactly equal, a golden spiral.

For example, a golden spiral can be approximated by first starting with a rectangle for which the ratio between its length and width is the golden ratio. This rectangle can then be partitioned into a square and a similar rectangle and this rectangle can then be split in the same way. After continuing this process for an arbitrary number of steps, the result will be an almost complete partitioning of the rectangle into squares. The corners of these squares can be connected by quarter-circles. The result, though not a true logarithmic spiral, closely approximates a golden spiral.

Another approximation is a Fibonacci spiral, which is constructed slightly differently. A Fibonacci spiral starts with a rectangle partitioned into 2 squares. In each step, a square the length of the rectangle's longest side is added to the rectangle. Since the ratio between consecutive Fibonacci numbers approaches the golden ratio as the Fibonacci numbers approach infinity, so too does this spiral get more similar to the previous approximation the more squares are added, as illustrated by the image.

Spirals in nature
Approximate logarithmic spirals can occur in nature, for example the arms of spiral galaxies – golden spirals are one special case of these logarithmic spirals, although there is no evidence that there is any general tendency towards this case appearing. Phyllotaxis is connected with the golden ratio because it involves successive leaves or petals being separated by the golden angle; it also results in the emergence of spirals, although again none of them are (necessarily) golden spirals. It is sometimes stated that spiral galaxies and nautilus shells get wider in the pattern of a golden spiral, and hence are related to both  and the Fibonacci series.
In truth, many mollusk shells including nautilus shells exhibit logarithmic spiral growth, but at a variety of angles usually distinctly different from that of the golden spiral.  This pattern allows the organism to grow without changing shape. Although spiral galaxies have often been modeled as logarithmic spirals, Archimedean spirals, or hyperbolic spirals, their pitch angles vary with distance from the galactic center, unlike logarithmic spirals (for which this angle does not vary), and also at variance with the other mathematical spirals used to model them.

Mathematics

A golden spiral with initial radius 1 is the locus of points of polar coordinates  satisfying

Where is the Golden Ratio.

The polar equation for a golden spiral is the same as for other logarithmic spirals, but with a special value of the growth factor :

or

with  being the base of natural logarithms,  being the initial radius of the spiral, and  such that when  is a right angle (a quarter turn in either direction):

Therefore,  is given by

An alternate formula for a logarithmic and golden spiral is

where the constant  is given by

which for the golden spiral gives  values of

if  is measured in degrees, and

if  is measured in radians.

With respect to logarithmic spirals the golden spiral has the distinguishing property
that for four collinear spiral points A, B, C, D belonging to arguments   
the point C is the projective harmonic conjugate of B with respect to A, D, i.e. the cross ratio (A,D;B,C) has the singular value −1. 
The golden spiral is the only logarithmic spiral with (A,D;B,C) = (A,D;C,B).

Polar slope

In the polar equation for a logarithmic spiral:

the parameter  is related to the polar slope angle :

hence

if measured in degrees, or

if measured in radians.

Its complementary angle

in radians, or

in degrees, is the angle the golden spiral arms make with a line from the center of the spiral.

See also
 Fibonacci number
 Golden angle
 Golden ratio
 Golden rectangle
 List of spirals
 Logarithmic spiral

References

 
Spirals